Eudi Silva de Souza, commonly known as Eudis (born 5 August 1983 in Paraíso do Norte, Paraná) is a Brazilian footballer.

Career 
He had a contract with FC Zurich till 2009 and was part of the 2006–07 Swiss Championship winning team, he left than in summer Zürich and moved to BSC Young Boys. His move to BSC Young Boys did not work out so he had two loan spells at Servette FC before joining on a permanent deal.

Eudi has previously played for Yverdon-Sport and FC Lausanne-Sport in the Swiss Challenge League.

On 1 March 2009 he signed for Servette FC on loan from BSC Young Boys. He had successful loan spells at Servette FC, so he joined them on a permanent deal.

In the summer 2012 transfer window, Eudis' contract with Servette expired, and it initially seemed that he would be leaving the club. However, on August 2, it was announced that Eudis had signed a five-month contract extension, with an option for a further six months.

Honours
 Swiss League: 2007

References

External links
 footballmercato
 Eudis profile on Servette FC 

1983 births
Living people
Brazilian footballers
Club Athletico Paranaense players
Yverdon-Sport FC players
FC Lausanne-Sport players
FC Zürich players
BSC Young Boys players
Servette FC players
Swiss Super League players
Swiss Challenge League players
Israeli Premier League players
Liga Leumit players
Hapoel Ra'anana A.F.C. players
Maccabi Herzliya F.C. players
Atlético Clube Paranavaí players
Expatriate footballers in Switzerland
Expatriate footballers in Israel
Brazilian expatriate sportspeople in Switzerland
Brazilian expatriate sportspeople in Israel
Association football forwards